Yuliya Beygelzimer and Olga Savchuk were the defending champions, but Savchuk chose to compete in Charleston instead. Beygelzimer played alongside Eva Hrdinová, but they lost in the first round to Ysaline Bonaventure and Demi Schuurs.

Bonaventure and Schuurs went on to win the title, defeating Gioia Barbieri and Karin Knapp in the final, 7-5, 4-6, [10-6].

Seeds

Draw

Draw

References 
 Main draw

Katowice Open - Doubles
2015 Doubles